Guy Christopher Mutton (born 17 October 1976), also known as Mutto, is an Australian singer, a Top 12 contestant in the fourth season of Australian Idol and ex-lead singer of the Gold Coast–based rock band, Soulframe.

Education and early career
Mutton graduated with a Bachelor of Exercise Science from Griffith University and worked in various areas of youth related employment. In 2001, he completed a Bachelor of Education (Graduate Entry) at QUT in Brisbane, majoring in Physical Education. The following years saw him on staff at various schools as a teacher, and also as a chaplain at a local Gold Coast high school.

Soulframe

Mutton put his career in education on hold when his band Soulframe began gaining popularity, and the band members decided to pursue music in a full-time capacity. With experience on drums and piano, Mutton was reluctant to audition as a vocalist, however, subsequent to his stepping into the role of lead vocals, Soulframe won several Australian music awards and released two albums, Sojourn and Escaping Entropy. Songs from their 2005 album, Escaping Entropy received national recognition, including various radio station airplay of their single 'Beautiful', collecting a win and three further nominations in categories at the 2004 Annual MusicOz Awards, two of the top 10 spots in their category for the 2005 Australian Songwriters Association Awards, and a win in their category for the NZ-based 2005 Pacific Songwriting Competition for their song 'Thread'.

Australian Idol

Mutton sang U2's "All I Want Is You" at the Brisbane auditions of Australian Idol 4 and made the top 24 in Sydney. During the first semi final round, Mutton sang "Meant to Live" by Switchfoot but did not accrue enough votes to advance. His nickname Mutto applied to SMS votes, in addition to his given name 'Guy'. On 31 August, he was selected into the wildcard show for a second chance to earn a place in the Top 12. Mutton performed Eskimo Joe's "Black Fingernails, Red Wine" which resulted in mixed responses from the judges. However, on 4 September, the judges advanced him into the Top 12 as the second of four successful wildcard contestants. Mutton was the fourth performer voted out of the Australian Idol Top 12 on 2 October.

Brisbane Auditions: "All I Want Is You" by U2
Top 24: "Meant to Live" by Switchfoot
Wildcard: "Black Fingernails, Red Wine" by Eskimo Joe
Top 12 - Contestant's Choice: "Where the Streets Have No Name" by U2
Top 11 - Rock: "Clocks" by Coldplay
Top 10 - Number One's: "The Reason" by Hoobastank
Top 9  - Song of Birth Year: "Dream On" by Aerosmith

Later career

After leaving Australian Idol, Mutton returned to lead vocals for Soulframe. He also guest hosted Sea FM's "The List with Age & Renee" Top 30 radio show, filling in for the week of 6 to 10 November in the absence of "Age", one of the regular hosts.

On 26 March 2010, Mutton released his first official single as a solo artist. The single "Wish", recorded at Loose Stones studios on the Gold Coast, mixed by JR McNeely in Nashville and mastered by Tom Coyne at Sterling Sound, NY, was released by Cowbell Digital Music worldwide. Since that time, Mutton has been predominantly involved with education, employed as a Physical Education teacher at Hillcrest Christian College. He has been performing and gigging in various forms - his website was re-launched in the latter weeks of 2015, noting his availability for various bookings and arrangement options.

Discography
2001 - Soulframe - Sojourn (Toupee Records )
2005 - Soulframe - Escaping Entropy (distributed nationally by MGM )
Recorded at Studios 301 in Byron Bay
2010 - Mutto - Wish (distributed worldwide by Cowbell Digital Music )

References

External links
 Soulframe on Pure Volume
 Official website

1976 births
Living people
English emigrants to Australia
Musicians from Gold Coast, Queensland
Australian Idol participants
Australian performers of Christian music
Australian pop musicians
Australian rock musicians
21st-century Australian singers
21st-century Australian male singers